Haus Publishing is a London-based publishing company which was established in 2002.

History
Haus Publishing was founded in 2002 by Barbara Schwepcke, the former publisher of Prospect magazine. The publisher has a book shop, BookHaus, on the premises. Starting with non-fiction they now cover many more types of books.

Arabia Books
Arabia Books was founded as a  joint venture by Haus Publishing and the independent UK publisher Arcadia Books in March 2008. The imprint publishes contemporary fiction in translation from the Arabic. Arcadia are no longer involved with the running of Arabia Books.

References

Book publishing companies of the United Kingdom
2002 establishments in England
Publishing companies established in 2002
British companies established in 2002